Garad (Harari: ገራድ, Oromo: Garaada) is a term used to refer to a clan leader or regional administrator. It was used primarily by Muslims in the Horn of Africa that were associated with Islamic states, most notably the Adal Sultanate.

Etymology 

The origin of the term Garad is uncertain. According to Enrico Cerulli, Garad originates from the era of the Adal emirate. Garad denotes a headman within a "Gaar" (clan). In the Somali language Garad roughly translates to "chief" or "wise man", as well as "wisdom". Garad also denotes a "chief" in Harari and Silt'e languages respectively. A proposed word origin in the Harari language is Gareqad, which literally means "front of the house."

History 

Several Muslim states and dominions including Hadiya Sultanate, Sultanate of Darfur, Ganz province, Harla and Somali Sultanate leaders were known as Garads.

Within Somali clans the use of the traditional hereditary title "Garad" is most widespread among the Dhulbahante and Karanle and was also used by the Habr Awal up until the 1940s. According to tradition the Somali Girhi's founding Garad "Aboker" lived five centuries ago in Harar. Tradition among the Somali Geledi clan claim Aw Kalafow, a descendant of Abadir, was the first to use the title Garad. Enrico Cerulli and others state that the Harari titles such as Garad were embraced by Somali chiefs.

In the early seventeenth century Emirate of Harar, Garad was the title given to tax collectors on behalf of the state. According to Richard Caulk, Garad was a bygone Harari title that was introduced to the Oromo of Hararghe whom also began using it. Garads were also commanders of the army called the Malassay in the Harar Emirate. An eighteen century Harari chronicle states the Harar region went through major upheavals in the late 1700s which led to the destruction of several villages administrated by Garads.

Somali Garad clans
There are many Somali clans suffixed with Garad, in particular subclans of the Dhulbahante, which include: 
Farah Garad
Mohamoud Garad
Guuleed Garad
Ali Garad
Yasin Garad
Abdi Garad

Places
Garad Wiil-Waal Airport, airport in Jijiga, Ethiopia
Garado, city in Wollo Province of Amhara Region derived from Garad.
Garad Erer, hill overlooking Porc-Epic Cave near Dire Dawa, Ethiopia
Garad, port city in Puntland, Somalia

Notable Garads

Mahfuz of Adal Sultanate
Dhuh Barar, last leader of the Somali Tolje'lo Isaaq dynasty
Deria Abdalla, 4th chief of the Habr Awal clan as well as the father of the clan's first Sultan, Abdulrahman Deria
Mohammed of Hadiya Sultanate, father of Empress Eleni of Ethiopia
Ibrahim, of Sultanate of Darfur
Usman Oda of Emirate of Harar, father of Oromo scholar Bakri Sapalo
Abun Adashe of Adal Sultanate
Dhidhin, first chief of the Somali Warsangali clan
Abubaker Qecchin of Adal Sultanate
Sediso K’albo, last leader of the Gan-Silt'e dynasty
Side, forefather of Halaba people
Aboker, first chief of Somali Girhi clan
Jama Ali, current chief of the Somali Dhulbahante clan
Hassan Injamo of Kebena
Aze of Hadiya
Ādan Ṣadiq of Imamate of Aussa, a Somali Issa chief
Abass, continued jihad in Ethiopian territory even after Imam Ahmed Gurey's death
Abdiqani Jama, grand chief of the Dhulbahante clan and one of the signatories of the Somaliland declaration of independence

References

Horn of Africa
Darfur
Society of Somalia
Adal Sultanate
Royal titles